Georg Gsell (28 January 1673 – 22 November 1740) was a Swiss Baroque painter, art consultant and art dealer. 

Gsell was born in St. Gallen where he married his first wife in 1697, Marie Gertrud von Loen of Frankfurt am Main. They moved to Amsterdam in 1704 where their fifth daughter Katharina was born in 1707. His wife died and he remarried Anna Horstmans, but divorced her in 1715, when he married a third time to Dorothea Maria Merian, the daughter of Maria Sibylla Merian. The couple was recruited by Peter the Great in 1716 and went to Russia, where he became first curator of the Imperial art gallery founded in 1720. His wife, Maria-Dorothea, became the curator of the Kunstkamera.  Their daughter Katharina married mathematician Leonhard Euler in 1734.

Gsell died, aged 67, in St. Petersburg and his wife survived him by three years. He is known for his catalog of the Kunstkamera in manuscript form, that has recently been rediscovered.

Literature
 Otto Gsell: Georg Gsell (1673–1749), Hofmaler Peters des Grossen (Courtpainter of Peter the Great)

References

External links

 
 Georg Gsell on Swiss World
 A work of Georg Gsell sold at Christie in 2000

1673 births
1740 deaths
17th-century Swiss painters
Swiss male painters
18th-century Swiss painters
18th-century Swiss male artists
Baroque painters
Russian people of Swiss descent
Merian family
People from St. Gallen (city)